Sudden Lights is a Latvian indie rock band, founded in 2012 in Riga. The band consists of vocalist Andrejs Reinis Zitmanis, drummer Mārtiņš Matīss Zemītis, guitarist Kārlis Matīss Zitmanis, and bassist Kārlis Vārtiņš. In February 2023, the group won Supernova 2023 with the song "Aijā" and will represent Latvia in the Eurovision Song Contest 2023.

Sudden Lights is one of the most streamed artists in Latvia. They play a combination of pop rock with slight alternative touches. Band's music  characterize  catchy melodies and melanholic notes. Group's musicians have multi-instrumentalist knowledge.

History 
The group was founded in 2012 by Andrejs Reinis Zitmanis and Mārtiņš Matīss Zemītis when they were both studying at the Pāvuls Jurjāns Music School in Riga. They were joined by Kārlis Matīss Zitmanis and Kārlis Vārtiņš. The first stepping stone on the path to growth for the band was their victory in the upcoming musician competition First Record  at the Riga State Gymnasium No.1. The first prize of the competition was the opportunity to record a song. The group used their prize to record "Tik Savādi" (So Strange).  This was the first song to be released by Sudden Lights. Their subsequent creative efforts culminated in the band's debut album, which was preceded by the singles Suburban Waltz, The Age and On this Side of the Fence, which were immediately given playing time by Latvian radio stations. Meanwhile, music videos were released for the songs Suburban Waltz and On this Side of the Fence.

Priekšpilsētas (2017) 
On 22 September 22 2017, Sudden Lights presented their debut album "Priekšpilsētas" (Suburbs), which is made up of 10 songs in both Latvian and English. The band's first self-organized concert, in which they performed songs from the album took place at the Daile Music House in Riga on April 12, 2018. he band was joined on stage by Latvian musician Tīna Šipkēvica.he album brought the a band a Golden Microphone 2018 nomination for best debut.

LTV Supernova 2018

At the beginning of 2018, the band took part in Supernova 2018, Latvia's national selection competition for the Eurovision Song Contest 2018, with their song "Just Fine", the closing track of their debut album, and placed second.

Initially, the group failed to qualify for the semi-finals, but the LTV jury decided to give them access on a wild card. Having gotten a second chance, the group performed in the final and finished in 2nd place.

Brainstorm Tin Drum Tour 

While presenting the album, "About the Boy Who Plays the Tin Drum", on a concert tour, Latvian pop–rock band Brainstorm announced  that Sudden Lights would join accompany them on their Latvian tour as the support act for all five concerts. 60,000 people attended the closing concert of the tour at the Mežaparks Open-Air Scene in Riga.

Second studio tour and concert tour 

With the singles I Don't Want to Come Down to Earth and Animal, the band has announced second album "Vislabāk ir tur, kur manis nav" (The Best Place is Where I'm Not Around), which was released on October 11, 2019.  The album was produced by Jānis Aišpurs, with whom the band had already collaborated on several singles.  In late February 2020, the group began their first concert tour in Latvia. They performed in Valmiera,Liepāja and Alūksne before the COVID-19 pandemic forced them to cancel the closing concert scheduled for March 20 in Riga. 

Third studio album and collaborations 

The band's 2020 collaboration with "Astro'n'out", that is, the song In Chaos won the Golden Microphone 2021 Award as Radio Hit of the Year[8]. In January 2021, the band started work on their third studio album together with producer Jānis Aišpurus. The first single of the forthcoming album is Silences, which was released in April 2021. Outside of writing the album, on which the band collaborated with the singer ANNNA, in remote sessions on the ZOOM platform, the song and radio single Save a Seat for Me was recorded. In August 2021, the next single of the forthcoming album In the Shadow of a Warm Summer was released. This was followed on 25 February 2022 by the release of the single Lanterns.  

The band's third studio album "Miljards vasaru" (A Billion Summers) was presented on May 13, 2022 in the Small Hall at Splendid Palace, with the band giving a small concert and presenting a documentary film about the production of the album.   The album was nominated for the Latvian record award Zelta Mikrofons 2023 as best pop album. The concert recording received a nomination as well as album desighn and two songs received people's choice nomination. 

Parallel to the release of the album, the single A Couple of Photos Not Taken was released. In the summer of 2022, - the song The World is Shaking , a collaboration between Sudden Lights and ZEBRENE was released. In the summer, Sudden Lights performed at the festivals Summer Sound, Positivus, Saldus Sun and Limbizkvīts, the Grand Latvian Music Concert, as well as at festivals in Jekabpils, Ventspils, Sigulda, Aizskraukle, Madona, Daugavpils and other cities. 

In the autumn of 2022, the band worked on its plan for a tour of Latvia, attracting the rapper ZEĻĢI as a special concert guest. Jasmine, a song jointly performed by Sudden Lights and ZEĻĢIS was also recorded during this period. The Billion Summer tour took place with concerts on 17 September in Jelgava (at the Black Hats Ballerina), September 23 in Valmiera (at the Valmiera Concert Hall), on September 24 in Liepaja (at the Wiktorija Culture Centre), and on October 8 at Hanzas Perons in Riga. The final concert of the tour at Hanzas Perons in Riga was also filmed as a concert video, Final Concert of Sudden Lights' Concert Tour Billion Summers.

2023 
In 2023, the group got 2. place with the single "Laternas"  in Latvian National radio 2 (LR2) Latvijas Radio song contest "Muzikālā Banka".

Sudden Lights participated in the Supernova 2023 contest organized by Latvian Television with the song "Aijā". The group won the competition and thereby gained the right to represent Latvia in the Eurovision Song Contest 2023. They are set to perform in the first half of the first semi-final.  

Sudden Lights are on their promo tour and performed at Moldova's Etapa Naţională 2023 .

Discography

Studio albums 
 Priekšpilsētas (Suburbs; 2017)
 Vislabāk ir tur, kur manis nav (The Best is where I am not; 2019)
 Miljards vasaru (A billion summers; 2022)

Singles 
 "Tik savādi" (So weird; 2015)
 "Priekšpilsētas valsis" (Waltz of the Suburb; 2016)
 "Laikmets" (Era; 2017)
 "Šajā sētas pusē" (On This Side of the Fence; 2017)
 "Negribu piezemēties" (I do not want to Land; 2018)
 "Dzīvnieks" (Animal; 2019)
 "Izbēgšana" (Escape; 2019)
 "Gaisma" (Light; 2019)
 "Haosā", feat. Astro'n'out (In Chaos; 2020)
 "Elektriskā gaisma" (The Electric Light; 2020)
 "Klusumi" (Silences; 2021)
 "Aizņem man vietu", feat. ANNNA (Save me a place; 2021)
 "Siltas vasaras ēnā" (Warm Summer's Shadow; 2021)
 "Laternas" (Lanterns; 2022)
 "Pasaule trīc", feat. ZaBrene" (The World is Trembling; 2022)
 "Jasmīns", feat. ZEĻĢIS (Jasmin; 2022)
 "Aijā" (2023)

References

External links 

Latvian alternative rock groups
Latvian indie rock groups
Musical groups established in 2012
2012 establishments in Latvia
Eurovision Song Contest entrants for Latvia
Eurovision Song Contest entrants of 2023